This was the first edition of the tournament.

Tallon Griekspoor won the title after defeating Alexander Ritschard 6–3, 6–2 in the final.

Seeds

Draw

Finals

Top half

Bottom half

References

External links
Main draw
Qualifying draw

Vesuvio Cup - 1